Yahor Vyachaslavavich Zubovich (born 1 June 1989) is a Belarusian professional footballer who plays for Neman Grodno.

Club career
Born in Uzda, Zubovich began playing football in the FC Torpedo-SKA Minsk youth system. He made one senior appearance for the club in the Belarusian Second League before leaving for FC MTZ-RIPO where he made his Belarusian Premier League debut in 2007.  On January 1, 2018, he moved to the Malaysian Super League team Melaka United.

International career
During 2008–2009, Zubovich was involved in the youth team of Belarus. At youth level he played in 5 official matches. He played in 2 games for Belarus at the 2012 Summer Olympics.

Honours

Naftan Novopolotsk
 Belarusian Cup: 2011–12

References

External links
 
 
 

1989 births
Living people
Belarusian footballers
People from Uzda District
Sportspeople from Minsk Region
Association football forwards
Expatriate footballers in Poland
Expatriate footballers in Malaysia
Expatriate footballers in Kazakhstan
Belarusian expatriate sportspeople in Poland
Belarusian expatriate sportspeople in Malaysia
Belarusian expatriate footballers
Olympic footballers of Belarus
Footballers at the 2012 Summer Olympics
FC Torpedo Minsk players
FC PMC Postavy players
FC Dinamo Minsk players
FC Torpedo-BelAZ Zhodino players
FC Partizan Minsk players
FC Belshina Bobruisk players
Jagiellonia Białystok players
FC Naftan Novopolotsk players
FC Neman Grodno players
FC Slutsk players
Melaka United F.C. players
FC Zhetysu players